Joseph Georges Leon Mantha (November 29, 1907 – January 25, 1990) was a Canadian ice hockey forward born in Lachine, Quebec.

Mantha played in the National Hockey League with the Montreal Canadiens. His career lasted from 1928 to 1941. His brother Sylvio Mantha also played in the NHL. Mantha would win the Stanley Cup twice in his career, in 1930 and 1931.

Career statistics

External links

1907 births
1990 deaths
Canadian ice hockey forwards
Ice hockey people from Montreal
Montreal Canadiens players
New Haven Eagles players
People from Lachine, Quebec
Stanley Cup champions
Washington Lions players